Winneconne High School is a public high school in Winneconne, Wisconsin. It educates students in grades 9 through 12 and is the only high school in the Winneconne Community School District.

History
A successful 2016 referendum authorized the school to build a new 600-seat auditorium as well as revamping its STEAM and business education areas.

Academics
Winneconne High School offers Advanced Placement classes, which about a fifth of the student body takes.

Demographics
WHS is 94 percent white, three percent Hispanic, one percent Asian and one percent black. Two percent of students identify as a part of tow or more races.

Athletics
The Wolves baseball team won the WIAA Division 2 title in 1992. After barely securing a playoff berth with a 4-5 record in the 2013 regular season, Winneconne won out in the playoffs and captured the Division 4 state schampionship.

Notable alumni
 Jule Berndt, politician
 Judith Klusman, politician

References

External links

Public high schools in Wisconsin
Schools in Outagamie County, Wisconsin